Bonk's Adventure, known as  in Japan and PC Kid in Europe, is a scrolling platform game developed by Red Company and Atlus and released in 1989 in Japan and 1990 in North America for the PC Engine/TurboGrafx-16. The Japanese title PC Genjin is a play on the system's original name, PC Engine, with the European title PC Kid similarly referencing the system's name. The first game in the Bonk series, it was followed by two more games for the TurboGrafx-16 before branching out to other platforms.

Bonk's Adventure was ported to the NES and Amiga, as well as being released as a coin-operated arcade game, under different titles (FC Genjin and BC Genjin in Japan, and BC Kid in Europe). A completely different game with the same name appeared on the Game Boy (under the title GB Genjin in Japan).

Plot
The game takes place in a fictional prehistoric era. Its protagonist is Bonk, a strong and bald caveboy who battles anthropomorphic dinosaurs and other prehistoric enemies. Bonk's mission is to rescue Princess Za (a small pink Plesiosaur-type reptile) who has been kidnapped by the evil King Drool (a large, green, Tyrannosaurus-type dinosaur). In the arcade version, Bonk is also assisted by a female version of himself.

Gameplay

Bonk attacks enemies by "bonking" them with his large, invincible forehead. Bonk starts the game with three hearts' worth of health, which are depleted to blue as Bonk takes damage, and three extra lives. Bonk's health can be restored in increments by collecting fruits and vegetables.

Bonk can also collect pieces of meat as power-ups; these lend him special abilities and make him stronger. There are three stages of a power-up: his normal self, a second stage during which he can stun enemies by pounding on the ground, and a third stage where he becomes temporarily invulnerable. Meat can be found in two varieties: big meat and small meat. The effects of meat are additive but wear off over time. A small meat gives Bonk the second stage of meat power, and a large one takes him to stage three. Eating small meat while in stage two will also put Bonk into the third, invincible stage of meat power. When the third stage effect wears off, he returns to the second state and remains there for a while before turning back to the regular Bonk. Eating either size of meat while in the third stage of meat power-up will reset the timer on Bonk's meat power.

Bonk can occasionally collect red heart power-ups that refill an entire heart worth of health, or even more rarely, a large red heart, which restores all of Bonk's missing health. There are also two rare, blue heart power-ups in the game, which will increase Bonk's maximum health by one heart.

Bonking an enemy will typically knock it backward and slightly into the air. Defeating an enemy yields points and also releases a small "smiley" power-up. Bonk's smileys are totaled at the end of each stage after defeating the boss of that stage. The player is given additional points and a caveman-type congratulation based on how many smileys were collected.

The arcade version is much different: at the beginning of the game, the player can choose from one of 28 different levels. Unlike the console versions, the levels are extremely short, and the goal is to get to the end as quickly as possible while trying to get a high score. There are various sports items in the stages, like basketballs and footballs. As long as Bonk continues to dribble these items, the player will get bonus points. There is a goal post at the end of each level, which grants more points if Bonk hits it at its apex. After completing three stages, the player gets to choose from one of seven boss battles. There are no power-ups in this version. Instead, there are smiley faces, which attach themselves to Bonk's head and can be used to absorb enemy projectiles or extend the length of Bonk's attacks. However, if Bonk gets hit once, he will lose all of his smiley faces, and he will have to pick them up again. This version of the game also includes a two-player mode, where player 2 plays as a female Bonk. The game can be set up to dispense tickets, and the ticket payouts can be adjusted by the operator.

Development
The character of Bonk, known in Japan as PC-Genjin (PC原人, in English: PC-Caveman) was created by Kobuta Aoki, and first appeared in comics created for the magazine Gekkan PC-Engine, in order to promote the console in Japan. In Japanese, PC-Genjin sounds like PC-Engine, and the PC stands for Pithecanthropus Computerus, a pun on Pithecanthropus erectus. It is generally called PC-Kid in English, as he was meant to be NEC's mascot at the time. Later, when the game was ported (or given different versions) for other platforms, it was renamed accordingly, like FC-Kid (after Family Computer, the original Japanese name for the NES, and the FC stood for Freakthoropus Computerus), GB-Kid (after the Game Boy), or the more generic name BC-Kid in some other versions, including Amiga. In North America, this was scrapped, as the game name is always Bonk's Adventure or something similar.

Reception
Entertainment Weekly picked the game as the #3 greatest game available in 1991, saying: "Cute, cartoony, and highly imaginative, this is one of the rare games that’s as much fun to watch as it is to play." In 1997 Electronic Gaming Monthly editors ranked the TurboGrafx-16 version as number 85 on their "100 Best Games of All Time", citing its imaginative level designs and hilarious player character.

Computer and Video Games reviewed BC Kid for the Amiga and scored it 93% in 1992. Tim Boone praised the original PC Kid for the PC Engine as being among his "all-time fave console games" and said the Amiga port was a faithful conversion, but with a different title. While praising the original PC Engine version, however, the review criticized the American TurboGrafx-16 version for being titled Bonk, which is an inappropriate slang in British English.

Legacy
In 2003, Hudson Soft included a 3D remake of Bonk's Adventure in their Hudson Selection series of games released exclusively in Japan for the PlayStation 2 and GameCube consoles.

Factor 5, developers of the Amiga port, have made the Amiga version of BC-Kid available for free through their company website.

The TurboGrafx-16 version was released for Wii's Virtual Console on November 22, 2006, and according to informal surveys it has been one of the most purchased games.

In March 2008, a version for mobile phones was released in Japan.

Hudson was developing a reboot of the franchise entitled "Bonk: Brink of Extinction" for WiiWare and PlayStation Network. With the closure of Hudson, the status and future of this title is uncertain.

On October 19, 2015, it was announced that Bonk's Adventure was given a rating on the Virtual Console for Wii U for a future release. After months of rumors, the game finally saw a Wii U release in its TurboGrafx-16 form on July 14, 2016. The PC Engine version of the game (fully in Japanese) was included on every regional variant of the TurboGrafx-16 Mini which was released exclusively through Amazon on March 19, 2020.

Notes

References

External links 

The Bonk Compendium

TurboGrafx-16 games
Nintendo Entertainment System games
Game Boy games
A.I Company games
Amiga games
Arcade video games
Virtual Console games
Mobile games
GameCube games
PlayStation 2 games
IOS games
PlayStation Network games
Side-scrolling platform games
1989 video games
Red Entertainment games
Atlus games
Bonk (series)
Single-player video games
Video games developed in Japan
Video games set in prehistory
Factor 5 games